Bertram Telford Clarke (29 March 1884 – 21 January 1956) was an Australian rules footballer who played for the Geelong Football Club in the Victorian Football League (VFL).

Football
He made his debut for Geelong against Fitzroy on 6 June 1904; he kicked one goal.

Notes

External links 

1884 births
1956 deaths
Australian rules footballers from Victoria (Australia)
Geelong Football Club players